Newark's Chinatown was a neighborhood in the city of Newark in Essex County, New Jersey, United States. It was an ethnic enclave with a large percentage of Chinese immigrants, centered along Market Street from 1875 and remaining on some scale for nearly one hundred years. The center of the neighborhood was directly east of the Government Center neighborhood. The first Chinese in Newark came from the community in neighboring Belleville, home of the East Coast's first Chinese community. The first Chinese businesses appeared in Newark in the second half of the 19th century and in the early part of the 20th century.  By the 1920s, the small area had a Chinese population of over 3000.

In 1910, a small lane with housing and shopping was built called Mulberry Arcade, connecting Mulberry Street and Columbia Street between Lafayette and Green Streets. In the 1920s, recurring federal opium raids disrupted the community, causing many to move to more peaceful places.  Despite an attempt to revive the neighborhood decades later, the Mulberry Arcade (the center of Chinatown) was removed in the 1950s. A 21st century project in the area is called Mulberry Commons.

Today there is barely any sign that a Chinatown existed in the neighborhood, and only a small Chinese population remains. There is a Chinese restaurant on Lafayette Street and another on Green St.  Nearby, the Sumei Multidisciplinary Arts Center on Liberty Street, in an old factory in the Chinatown neighborhood, exhibits arts from various world cultures.

References

External links 
Sumei Multidisciplanary Center
When Newark Had a Chinatown
1910 map showing Chinese population in Chinatown

Chinese-American culture in New Jersey
Ethnic enclaves in New Jersey
Neighborhoods in Newark, New Jersey
Newark
Populated places established in 1875
1875 establishments in New Jersey